Monstera punctulata is a species of flowering plant from the family Araceae found in southern part of Mexico, and Central America.

Description
They are also vaginate to the geniculum with its deciduous sheath wings, which sometimes are fibrous at the base of the petiole. The species have a bright green coloured lamina that is soft in texture and is not glossy.

Much wider distribution and ecology
It is found in such Central American countries as Belize, Costa Rica, and Panama. In central Petén, Guatemala it is found growing on limestone.

References

Flora of Central America
Flora of Mexico
punctulata